Mudin is a surname of differing origins. It may refer to:

 Gul Mudin (1994–2010), Afghan child murdered by United States troops in the Maywand District murders
 Imre Mudin (1887–1918), Hungarian track and field athlete
 István Mudin (1881–1918), Hungarian track and field athlete

Arabic-language surnames
Hungarian-language surnames